Garat De Axea or Caratachea in its modern spelling is a surname of Basque origin from the Spain and French Navarre territory.

Related names or alternate forms include: "Garat", "Garatachea", and "Caratachea". The name originated in Navarre. The original spelling "Garat De Axea" (The letter X in Basque is the equivalent of the Spanish ch)
"Garate" meaning "Victory" and "etxea" which means house"

The surname "Caratachea" or "Garatachea" derives form the Lord Simon De Garat. The family settled in Spanish Navarre in the Valle De Mija, in the parish of Beguioir (Navarre).
Beltran De Garat, made a petition in 1604, for the King of Arms of the Kingdom of Navarre to confirm the Coat of Arms granted to his family. Another branch of the family bore the name of Garate. This family had several ancestral seals, two of them located in Elgoibar and named Suso and Yuso, another one in Azcoitia, all of them in the province of Guipuzcoa (Basque Country)
Another house in Bilboa, in the province of Vizcaya, one in Amurrio, in the province of Alva and another in Murugarren, in the district of Estella (Navarre) The Family of Garat De Axea or Caratachea was related by marriage to Irumberry y de Salaberry.

Some cognate forms resulting from dialectal distribution and adaptation to other languages are:
Sebastian Caratachea, Laszlo Caratachea, Raphael Caratachea, Garate, Garat, Garat de Axea, Garatachea, Garratochea.

Basque language
Basque-language surnames